Marvel 1602 is an eight-issue comic book  limited series published in 2003 by Marvel Comics. The limited series was written by Neil Gaiman, penciled by Andy Kubert, and digitally painted by Richard Isanove; Scott McKowen illustrated the distinctive scratchboard covers. The eight-part series takes place in a timeline where Marvel superheroes exist in the Elizabethan era; faced with the destruction of their world by a mysterious force, the heroes must fight to save their universe. Many of the early Marvel superheroes — Nick Fury, the X-Men, the Fantastic Four, and Spider-Man — as well as villains such as Doctor Doom and Magneto appear in various roles.

Neil Gaiman had always been a fan of Marvel, and editor Joe Quesada approached Gaiman to work on a project which eventually evolved into 1602. The success of the comic led to three sequels, entitled 1602: New World, Marvel 1602: Fantastick Four, and Spider-Man: 1602. There is also a short story, "Son of the Dragon", starring the 1602 version of The Hulk in the second issue of Hulk: Broken Worlds. In 1602: Witchhunter Angela of Marvel's 2015 Secret Wars event, Angela appears as a hunter of witchbreed (mutants).

The pocket reality seen at the end of the limited series in which the continuing Marvel 1602 universe takes place is classified as Earth-311.

Development

Background 
Neil Gaiman stated in an afterword to the series that he had always viewed the Marvel universe as "magic". The editors of 
1602, Nick Lowe and Joe Quesada, approached Gaiman after Quesada became Marvel's Editor in Chief with the intent for Gaiman to work on a project for Marvel. Gaiman eventually agreed to write a Marvel comic in August 2001, although he was not sure what it would contain. When the September 11, 2001 attacks occurred, Gaiman decided that he did not want planes, skyscrapers, bombs or guns in his comic. "I didn't want it to be a war story, and I didn't want to write a story in which might made right – or in which might made anything." On a trip to Venice soon after, Gaiman was struck by how the "past seemed very close at hand"; he returned from the trip knowing the story he wanted to tell. The time was chosen because "it was a nice place to set the story. It gave me America and it gave me a lot of things that I wanted in terms of the way the world was changing. It also gave me the sense of wonder and magic."

Gaiman described writing the series as odd, since he had not written comics in half a decade; the story was trimmed down significantly as the size went from six 36-page chapters to eight 22-page segments. He also wanted to write a comic that was different from The Sandman, his most recognized work. The profits of the series went to help fund his Marvels and Miracles LLC company, which is fighting for the rights to Marvelman.

Illustration 

Unlike usual penciled pages, Marvel 1602 used a technique called "enhanced pencils", whereby the finished pencil drawings are sent straight to the colorist instead of to an inker first. This technique had been used before on Kubert's Origin, and results in cleaner and more elaborate lines.

Editor Nick Lowe noticed theater posters done by Scott McKowen and decided that the "engraving 'look' of the scratchboard would be interesting for the historical setting of this story." Scratchboard is a technique where a sharp knife is used to scrape through a layer of black ink to a hard chalk surface underneath; in effect, artists draw white lines on an all-black surface. All McKowen's illustrations were done by hand and then colored later in Photoshop. For inspiration, McKowen looked at seventeenth-century engravings. He also added scrolls or flags to the covers for the Marvel 1602 titles, basing the designs on Renaissance paintings where scrolls are used to comment on the scenes depicted.

The hardbound edition features a scratchboard illustration depicting the main characters whispering discreetly to each other on the cover.  According to McKowen, the image was inspired by a depiction of the masterminds behind the "Gunpowder Plot", an attempt to blow up Parliament during the reign of King James. Since the characters of the story are all traitors in the eyes of King James, they were drawn in a similar fashion.

Synopsis

Premise 
In the year 1602 in the Marvel Universe, for an unknown reason, superheroes have appeared about 400 years early. They were born and bred in this era and some hold important positions in high places. When the characters come to realize that something is wrong with the universe, the heroes must solve the mystery behind their own existence, while dealing with intrigue at the courts of Elizabeth and James.

Plot 
All over Europe, strange weather is provoking panic. Many believe the unnatural occurrences are the beginning of the Apocalypse. Dr. Stephen Strange, the court physician of Queen Elizabeth I, senses that there are unnatural forces at work. He has also been asked to watch over the secret treasure of the Knights Templar which is being brought over from Jerusalem. Elizabeth tells her head of intelligence, Sir Nicholas Fury, to bring the weapon to England safely. Fury in turn contracts blind minstrel and agent Matthew Murdoch (Daredevil of Marvel 1602) to rendezvous with the Templar guard somewhere in Europe and secure the weapon. Later that evening, Fury and his assistant Peter Parquagh are attacked by a winged assassin whom Fury disables and locks in the Tower of London.

Meanwhile, the ship Virginia Maid arrives in England from the New World, carrying the young Virginia Dare, the first child born in Roanoke colony, as well as her Native American bodyguard Rojhaz. They are taken to meet the Queen only for a second winged assassin to snatch Virginia. Rohjaz quickly disables the attacker, but Virginia has transformed into a white gryphon. Rojhaz subdues Virginia, and Stephen Strange bespells her to human form before Fury sees her transformed. She has strange shapeshifting powers, and Strange suspects she is the cause of the disastrous weather. Fury interrogates one of the assassins to learn who sent him. He is told that it is Count Otto von Doom, ruler of Latveria, but Fury is too late to stop one of Doom's machines from killing Elizabeth with a poison gas released by dropping a pill into aqua regia.

With Elizabeth's death, James VI becomes ruler of both England and Scotland. James is distrustful of "witchbreed", those with magical or uncanny powers, and collaborates with Spanish High Inquisitor Enrique to blame the witchbreed of England, headed by Carlos Javier (Charles Xavier of Marvel 1602), for Elizabeth's death. Fury, a friend of Carlos and his students, is forced to take the witchbreed to the Tower. Strange, Javier, and Fury meet there and discuss how to save the world — an act which will almost surely lead to them being branded traitors by James. Strange has learned that Murdoch and the Templar agent Donal have been betrayed and are now in the hands of Doom. Strange also learns that Doom has been holding captive four heroes from the ship Fantastick, including Fury's friend Sir Richard Reed. Javier agrees to help Fury; all taking a ship levitated by Javier and his page John Grey across the continent.

Strange meanwhile finds himself on the moon where he meets the Watcher Uatu, who tells him that the strange events are due to an anomaly he calls the Forerunner. The Forerunner is from the future and its presence in the past has disrupted reality to the point of impending annihilation of not only Strange's world but all other universes as well. Explaining his theory that the emergence of various superhumans on Stephen's Earth four hundred years before their season is the result of the universe trying to save itself, the Watcher tells Strange that he will not be able to repeat what he has learned while he lives.

Fury, Javier, and his witchbreed launch a successful attack on Count Doom's fortress; John Grey, revealed to be female, dies from her exertions in keeping the ship intact. The Four of the Fantastick are freed, and Doom is horribly scarred by what he believes is the Templar's treasure; in fact, Donal's walking stick is the true treasure, used to summon the Norse god Thor. The ship of fugitives heads for the New World. In Spain, Enrique is exposed as a witchbreed and a Jew and sentenced to be burned at the stake with his young acolytes, Petros and Sister Wanda. Enrique reveals that he is able to manipulate magnetism and breaks their chains; they escape on a ship of their own, also bound for America.

Sir Stephen Strange is executed by James, who is furious that Fury and the witchbreed escaped him. He communicates telepathically with his wife Clea, able to tell his secrets now that he no longer lives. He informs her that the Forerunner is the cause of the anomalies and that universal salvation depends on its transport back to its time; she takes his head from the pike and sets off for America with Virginia and Rojhaz. Clea believes that Strange's suspicions were wrong: the Forerunner is not Virginia but Rojhaz. Rojhaz reveals himself to be Steve Rogers. After fighting against a future dictatorship of the 21st century run by the Purple Man, Rogers was captured and sent back in time so as to completely erase his legacy. He was taken in by Native Americans who misheard his name; upon encountering the struggling Roanoke colony, he helped it survive and became Virginia's bodyguard.

Fury and company arrive at the Roanoke colony, where they discover the rift. Fury despairs that he has betrayed the Crown. Javier senses three ships incoming: the Virginia Maid, Enrique's ship, and a ship carrying James's agents, among them his advisor David Banner and Peter, who has been coerced into loyalty. Realizing that the rift is radiating "galvanic" energy, Javier enlists his adversary Enrique to manipulate the rift; he agrees for an unspecified boon. Donal summons Thor once more, enabling the necessary input of energy to open the rift again. Fury kills all of James's agents except for Peter and Banner; in England, Murdoch threatens James with death should he harm Fury. Rogers refuses to go back through the rift, hoping to build a better America. Fury incapacitates him and carries the body back through the rift, thus going into the future himself.

The rift and the universe restore themselves, meaning the destruction of the alternate timeline; however, Uatu the Watcher is granted a "pocket universe" by his colleagues in which the 1602 timeline remains intact, and where the powered fugitives decide to settle in the Roanoke colony, declaring it a free place for all. Meanwhile, while walking in the woods with Virginia, Peter is bitten by a spider and Banner, who shielded Peter from the energies released when Rojhaz and Fury entered the rift, has changed into a hulking gray monster. Intrigued by the continuing events, Uatu continues to watch the new universe (later designated Earth-311).

Characters 

1602 features both historical figures and many of the original Marvel superheroes and villains. Some popular characters, such as Wolverine, were not added, because of Gaiman's vision to address the heroes of the 1960s. "The territory doesn't go much further than 1969 in terms of the characters that I picked to use," Gaiman noted. "I couldn't get everybody in because there are an awful lot of Marvel characters."

 Elizabeth I of England: The aging Queen of England. Already close to death, she is killed by a poisonous gas device constructed by Otto Von Doom (the Doctor Doom of this reality).
 James I of England: Originally King James VI of Scotland, James becomes the monarch over England as well with Elizabeth's death. James maintains an intense hatred of witchbreed (the mutants of this reality) and seeks to destroy them along with any who practice sorcery or witchcraft.
 Virginia Dare: The daughter of Ananias Dare, and the first English child born in the Americas. In this world, the Roanoke Colony did not disappear in the 1580s; when Steve Rogers went into this world he saved the colony, which would have been killed by starvation. Dare touches the rift caused by Rogers' arrival. She has the ability to transform into white-furred animals when frightened, which she later learns to control, and appears to be the equivalent to Alpha Flight's Snowbird who has a similar appearance and powers, though Neil Gaiman had denied this.
 Uatu, the Watcher: A younger member of a race of intelligent beings who have sworn not to interfere in the affairs of lesser races, only to watch and observe. He breaks this oath, however, by explaining the situation to an astral projection of Doctor Stephen Strange.
 Sir Nicholas Fury: The Queen's intelligence officer (referred to as the "intelligencer") and responsible for foiling many past plots against the monarch. Seemingly killed when he carries an unconscious Rojhaz into the dimensional rift.
 Doctor Stephen Strange: The Queen's Physician, who is also a magician and alchemist. He allows himself to be beheaded by King James, which subsequently frees him from the restriction placed upon him by Uatu, the Watcher (namely, that he could not reveal what he knows while still living).
 Peter Parquagh: Sir Nicholas' apprentice; left orphaned and tended to by his aunt and uncle until Fury arrived and took the boy to London.
 Matthew Murdoch: A blind Irish minstrel who moonlights as a freelance agent. Matthew was blinded by a mysterious substance he encountered as a child; yet from it, he also acquired heightened senses.
 Clea Strange: Stephen Strange's wife and assistant, Clea actually comes from another dimension. After bringing her husband's severed head to the Roanoke colony – thus fulfilling her last promise to him – she asks the heroes to bury the head with the rest of the body and then returns to her home dimension.
 Rojhaz: Virginia's blonde-haired, blue-eyed Native American bodyguard, who in fact is a displaced Captain America from a dystopian future. When the government of his time ruled by Purple Man captured him and attempted to execute him using advanced technology, he was accidentally sent back in time – the event which triggered the alternate timeline to begin with – thus forming the paradox of the story.
 Carlos Javier: A Spaniard living in England, where he runs a "College for the Sons of Gentlefolk", in fact a haven for "witchbreed". His students include Roberto Trefusis, Scotius Summerisle, Hal McCoy, Werner, and "John" Grey (who is in fact a young woman with psychic powers rivaling that of his own).
 The Four from the Fantastick: A band of explorers who gained powers when their ship encountered a strange energy vortex at sea. The four are Captain Benjamin Grimm, Sir Richard Reed, Susan Storm, and John Storm. Their bodies were reshaped into the four elements: Reed's body became pliable like water, Grimm's body became solid rock, Susan's body became weightless and invisible like air, and John's body became living fire. They are eventually captured by Doom.
 Grand Inquisitor Enrique: Born a Sephardic Jew, a young Enrique was forcibly baptized and seduced by a Catholic priest, and thus inducted into the church. As an adult, he leads the Spanish Inquisition – a position of power through which he can further his own plans. Although ordered to execute the witchbreed, he hides those whom he can pass off as normal. Secretly a witchbreed himself, he uses his activities as a cover to form a "Brotherhood of Those Who Will Inherit the Earth". He is assisted by Sister Wanda and Petros, who are secretly his children. He is also aided by Toad, despite Toad's betrayal at one point.
 David Banner: An advisor to King James, Banner is sent to Roanoke in order to kill Fury. When the rift is closed at the end of the story, Banner is caught within the backlash and is later seen lurking in the nearby woods as a massive gray-skinned creature (the Hulk).
 Count Otto von Doom: Doom is the ruler of Latveria, known as Otto the Handsome due to his perfect physique and appearance. He captures the Fantastick Four in order to force Reed's compliance in creating war machines, poisons, and various other inventions. Von Doom is later struck and badly burned by Thor's lightning, although he survives.
 Donal the Guardian of the Templar Treasure and alter ego to Thor, who is captured by Count Otto von Doom on his way to deliver the treasure of the Templars (the hammer Mjolnir disguised as a simple walking stick) to England. He is rescued by Sir Nicholas Fury and the witchbreed and is taken to the New World along with the Fantastick Four.
 Natasha: She travels with Matthew while en route to meet Donal, who is bringing the Templar Treasure to England. Natasha is revealed to be working for Count Otto von Doom.

Reception and legacy 
The first issue of 1602 was ranked first in August 2003 US comics with pre-order sales of 150,569.

1602 received mixed praised upon its release with Comics Bulletin stating "Is 1602 good? Yes, it's damn good. Is it revolutionary or even ground breaking? No. Sorry, but I can't go so far as to call a glorified What If? series anything more than what it is; a well done re-imagination of the Marvel Universe." Entertainment Weekly declared that the combination of writing and moody artwork meant "the Marvel Universe hasn't been this engrossing in ages." ShakingThrough.net noted that fans looking for elements of Gaiman's The Sandman would be disappointed; "It's not a senses-shattering Marvel epic, but then it's not meant to be. It's nothing more or less than a chance to enjoy reinterpretations of some familiar characters." UGO Networks concurred, stating "there doesn't need to be a 'point' in re-imagining familiar icons — it's simply meant to be fun. [...] The result of 1602 is agreeable entertainment." The series won several awards, including the Quill Book Award for Graphic Novels. The first issue was also awarded the 2003 Diamond Distributors Gem Award as "Comic of the Year".

Conversely, Time Magazine listed it as the worst comic of 2003, although the list's composer later stated "he didn't actually mean it was the worst comic of the year." UGO's Darren Latta noted as a downside to the series that "the approach maybe a little too subdued at times." Latta also felt that despite being familiar with the setting, Gaiman never utilized the period to its full potential. Others simply felt that Gaiman's involvement led to inflated expectations; one review noted that while reading "I [...] felt at times like maybe it was all a little bit too cute, a little bit too in-jokey."

James Fleming, an adjunct instructor at Keiser University and Southern New Hampshire University, has also written about the use of the postmodern tradition in 1602 and how this is employed as a means to respond to the post-9/11 world in which the comic was written.

Sequels 
1602s success led to three sequels.

 The first, 1602: New World, takes place shortly after the end of 1602, with the heroes settling down in America. The series was written by Greg Pak and illustrated by Greg Tocchini, and the first issue was published in August 2005. During that time, Lord Iron and Captain Ross had arrived to hunt down David Banner while coming into conflict with the Spider and Virginia Dare. Meanwhile, Master Osborn tries to turn the natives against the settlers.
 The second sequel, Marvel 1602: Fantastick Four, was written by Peter David and pencilled by Pascal Alixe. The story involves the Fantastic Four's adventures in London, the return of Otto Von Doom, and the "Four Who Are Frightful" when they capture William Shakespeare to chronicle Otto von Doom's travels to Bensaylum (this reality's Alantis).
 The third sequel Spider-Man: 1602, was written by Jeff Parker and pencilled by Ramon Rosanas. The story centers on the continuing adventures of the Spider and features reinterpretations of Doctor Octopus, the Lizard, and Mary Jane Watson. Also appearing are the Beast, Janet and Henry Pym, the Kingpin (reimaged as a pirate named King's Pin), Bullseye (reimaged as an assassin and first mate of the King's Pin), and Steve Rogers.

Spider-Verse 
The Marvel 1602 universe appears in a lead-up to Spider-Verse. Peter Parquah is on stage at the Globe Theatre with Marion Jane Watson's family when Morlun appears. Peter attempts to defend himself, but Morlun proves too powerful. Morlun brings down the Globe Theater around everyone, and absorbs Peter's life essence. Before disappearing into another dimension, Morlun declares that all spiders will die.

Secret Wars (2015) 
Marvel 1602 appears in Secret Wars where its domain on Battleworld is referred to as King James' England. It is mostly featured in the comic 1602: Witch Hunter Angela (which features a witch hunter version of Angela). The Secret Wars Marvel 1602 now includes Bronze Age and Modern Age Marvel characters where its King James is a variation of Wolverine.

Web-Warriors 
The Web Warriors (Alternate versions of Spider-Man) visited the 1602 Universe to deal with the dimension's version of Sinister Six called the Sinister Sextet which consists of Carnage, Electro, Karnov, Magus, and Serpent. After apprehending the villains, they noticed the dimension's Electro has escaped. Unbeknownst to the heroes, Electro followed them back to the Great Web.

In other media

Television 
 The Marvel 1602 reality appeared in The Super Hero Squad Show episode "1602".
 Neil Gaiman (the creator of Marvel 1602) mentioned in a tweet that he pitched the idea of a live-action adaptation of the series to Marvel Television only to be rejected. Kevin Feige has also stated that he is interested in a Marvel 1602 series alongside Earth X but noted that there must be a built-in audience for it. It was later announced that season 2 of the Marvel Cinematic Universe animated series What If...? will adapt the storyline for an episode.

Video games 
 Spider-Man 1602 is an unlockable costume in Spider-Man: Shattered Dimensions.
 Spider-Man 1602 is playable in Spider-Man Unlimited.

Collected editions

See also 
 Dark Knights of Steel, a comic book series by DC Comics with a similar premise.

References

External links 
 Annotations to Marvel 1602
 1602: Fantastick Four on Marvel.com

2003 comics debuts
2004 comics endings
Comics by Neil Gaiman
Marvel Comics dimensions
Roanoke Colony
Cultural depictions of Elizabeth I
Cultural depictions of James VI and I